Fitness is an American synth-rock duo based in Los Angeles, California. The only consistent members are Max Collins, from Eve 6, and Kenny Carkeet, formerly from Awolnation.

Background

Formation and Aggroculture (2016–2017) 
Collins and Carkeet originally first met at a music festival in upstate New York in 2012. The band itself was formed in late 2016. In March 2017 Carkeet announced that he would be leaving Awolnation to spend more time with Fitness.

In late 2016 and early 2017, Fitness released two stand-alone singles: "Get Dead" and "Supafeeler (Vice Grip)." The next single the band released was "Feel The Weight," on April 14, 2017. Another single, "I Don't Feel Anything" was released on August 24, 2017. Their debut EP, Aggroculture, was announced on the same day and was released on September 15, 2017. The title of the EP is a portmanteau of "aggro", which is a slang term meaning aggravation or aggression, and "culture".

Karate (2018–2019) 
On February 2, 2018, they released the single Matter of Time, with a music video on the same day. Max Collins once said that the song "Matter of Time," like the phrase "it's just a matter of time" itself, can have a positive or negative connotation depending on how the person looks at it. A remix of the song by Matthew Koma was released on August 27, 2018. Koma also makes a cameo appearance in the song's music video.

The band's debut album, Karate, was released on June 29, 2018. Although they did not upload the audio of their songs on their YouTube channel, the audio was instead uploaded by SoulSpazm14. IndieCentralMusic described it as a "kick-ass album." Fitness then began touring with Wild Moccasins and Kongos in mid-late 2018. On January 9, 2019, the band released a lyric video for "Cold Rain" on their YouTube channel.

Opera Cadaver (2019–present) 
On May 2, 2019, they released a single called "AMEN!!," with a music video on the same day. Over the course of the next few months, they released several other singles, such as "Yellowjackets", "High", and "Dirty Work". They also embarked on another tour with Kongos from October 1 to October 16. They released three new songs on March 27, 2020, including the lead single to their upcoming EP, "Keep It Good." The EP, titled Opera Cadaver, was released on April 10, 2020. The band did not go on tour for the EP most likely because of COVID-19 pandemic, though they did not make an official statement.

Discography

Studio albums 
 Karate (2018)

EPs 
 Aggroculture (2017)
 Opera Cadaver (2020)

Singles

Musical styles 
Fitness's sound has been best described as alternative rock and aggressive synth-pop. All-Access Music has described the project as a "middle finger to convention and expectations."

Band name 
"Fitness" is often seen as an obscure name for a band. Collins said once in an interview with Bus Invaders that he and Kenny Carkeet consciously named their band Fitness to make it intentionally hard for people to search for."Our band is called Fitness. Fitness is impossible to find on the internet. By naming ourselves a name that's impossible to find on the internet, we're just setting ourselves... I don't know, 173 odd paces behind our competitors, and that's the way we like it. But if you do want to find us, all of our socials are FitnessWasTaken, because it was. You look up "Fitness band" and you're just going to get something that counts your pulse for you, or whatever."

- Max CollinsOn Amazon, the band is known as The Fitness.

There is an entirely separate Canadian band called Fitness from Edmonton.

Personnel

Main 
Max Collins (lead vocals, bass)
 Kenny Carkeet (backing vocals, guitar, synthesizers)

Touring Member 
 Ben Hilzinger (drums)

References 

Synth rock
American musical duos
American electronic rock musical groups
Rock music duos
Rock music groups from California
Musical groups established in 2016